The Vickery-Baylies House is a historic house located at 56 Summer Street in Taunton, Massachusetts.

Description and history 
The -story, wood-framed house was built in 1830, most likely by one of the city's local mill owners. The house is one of only two large-scale Greek Revival houses (the other is the Tisdale-Morse House) to survive from that period. Charles Vickery, whose family owned it for much of the second half of the 19th century, was the son of a ship's captain, and a merchant and banker in the city.

The house was listed on the National Register of Historic Places on July 5, 1984.

See also
National Register of Historic Places listings in Taunton, Massachusetts

References

Houses in Taunton, Massachusetts
National Register of Historic Places in Taunton, Massachusetts
Houses on the National Register of Historic Places in Bristol County, Massachusetts
Houses completed in 1830
Greek Revival houses in Massachusetts